Fyodorovka may refer to the following places:

Kazakhstan
Fyodorovka, Fyodorov District, Kostanay Region
Fyodorovka, Uzunkol District, Kostanay Region
Fyodorovka, West Kazakhstan Region

Russia
Fyodorovka, Russia, several inhabited localities

Ukraine
Fedorovka, Ukraine